The Antalya State Symphony Orchestra is an orchestra located in Antalya.

Founded in 1995 as Antalya Chamber Orchestra later became symphony orchestra in 1997.

Principal conductor is the first woman conductor of Turkey, Inci Özdil.

References

External links
Official website of the Ministry of Culture and Tourism of Turkey

Musical groups established in 1989
Turkish symphony orchestras
Culture in Antalya
Ministry of Culture and Tourism (Turkey)
Symphony orchestras